Li Yingyun (born 6 September 1995) is a Chinese basketball player. She was named to the Mythical Three (All-Tournament Team) at the 2018 FIBA 3x3 World Cup.

References

1995 births
Living people
Chinese women's basketball players
Guards (basketball)
Basketball players from Shanghai
Shanghai Swordfish players
Asian Games medalists in basketball
Basketball players at the 2018 Asian Games
Asian Games gold medalists for China
Medalists at the 2018 Asian Games